The Continental Basketball Association Newcomer of the Year was an award given to the best player in the CBA who had prior professional basketball experience, but was new to the league. The award was known as the Eastern Basketball Association Newcomer of the Year during the 1977–78 season, but the league re-branded as the Continental Basketball Association the following season and subsequently the name of the award changed.

Key

Table

References

New
American basketball trophies and awards
Lists of basketball players in the United States